Anika Todd (born 11 March 1990) is a Canadian racing cyclist. She rode at the 2014 UCI Road World Championships.

References

External links

1990 births
Living people
Canadian female cyclists
Place of birth missing (living people)